Thomas Stanton (August 11, 1869 – May 7, 1950) was a United States Navy sailor and a recipient of the United States military's highest decoration, the Medal of Honor.

Biography
Stanton was born on August 11, 1869, in Ireland and, after immigrating to the United States, he joined the Navy from New York around 1898. 

On that day, while the North Dakota was conducting tests using oil as fuel, an explosion occurred, killing three sailors and endangering the ship. In the engine room, pieces of hot coal and coke floated in waist-high hot water, oil was aflame above one of the boilers, and the entire room was filled with smoke, steam, and fumes. Despite these dangers, Stanton and five other men of the ship's engineering department entered the engine room to haul the boiler fires and perform other tasks necessary to prevent a boiler explosion. After ensuring the safety of the ship, they then searched for and removed the bodies of the three sailors killed in the initial explosion.

For these actions, Stanton and the five other men were awarded the Medal of Honor a month later, on October 4, 1910. The others were Chief Machinist's Mate Karl Westa, Chief Watertender August Holtz, Chief Watertender Patrick Reid, Machinist's Mate First Class Charles C. Roberts, and Watertender Harry Lipscomb.

Stanton died May 7, 1950, at age 80 and was buried at Saint Columba Catholic Cemetery in Middletown, Rhode Island.

Medal of Honor citation
Stanton's official Medal of Honor citation reads:
For extraordinary heroism in the line of his profession during the fire on board the U.S.S. North Dakota, 8 September 1910.

See also

List of Medal of Honor recipients in non-combat incidents

References

External links

Home of Heroes
USS North Dakota: Eighth Grade Lesson - The Floating Community - Fire and Engine Troubles
Chief Petty Officers earning the Medal of Honor

1869 births
1950 deaths
19th-century Irish people
Irish sailors in the United States Navy
Irish emigrants to the United States (before 1923)
United States Navy sailors
United States Navy Medal of Honor recipients
Irish-born Medal of Honor recipients
Non-combat recipients of the Medal of Honor